The Voice TV was the name of a Danish television station that broadcast music videos 24 hours a day. 7'eren was launched on January 1, 2012, as a programming block on The Voice TV, and a year later, on January 1, 2013, the channel renamed The Voice TV into 7'eren, by rebranding itself as a channel for youth programming.

The same happened to Finland's The Voice, it changed named Kutonen on 1 September 2012. The Voice channels are in different countries.

Due to poor ratings, the station was closed by the end of October 2014 and replaced with a Danish version of Investigation Discovery.

References

Television stations in Denmark
Defunct television channels in Denmark
Warner Bros. Discovery networks
Television channels and stations established in 2012
Television channels and stations disestablished in 2014

da:The Voice TV
de:The Voice TV